Violin Concerto is an album by Joshua Bell accompanied by the London Philharmonic Orchestra of a composition written by British composer Nicholas Maw. The album was nominated for the 2000 Mercury Prize.

References

External links
 

1999 classical albums